Manaka (written: 真中 or 眞中) is a Japanese surname. Notable people with the surname include:

, Japanese footballer
, Japanese baseball player
, Japanese footballer

Fictional characters:
, protagonist of the anime series PriPara

Manaka (written: 愛風, 舞菜香 or まなか in hiragana) is also a feminine Japanese given name. Notable people with the name include:

, Japanese voice actress
, Japanese shogi player 
, Japanese sprint canoer
Manaka Matsumoto, Japanese footballer  
, Japanese singer

Fictional characters:
Manaka Sajyou, a character from the original Fate/stay night light novel, Fate/Prototype: Fragments of Sky Silver
 Manaka Ujīe, a minor character in Haikyū!!
, a character in the anime series Nagi no Asukara

Japanese feminine given names
Japanese-language surnames